Antonio Meola (born 8 May 1990) is an Italian professional footballer who plays as a right back for Serie D club Chieti.

Career
Born in Naples, Meola made his professional debut for Livorno during the 2011–12 season. He previously played for Lucca and Avellino.

On 21 November 2019, Meola joined Chieti.

References

1990 births
Footballers from Naples
Living people
Italian footballers
Association football fullbacks
U.S. Livorno 1915 players
F.C. Lumezzane V.G.Z. A.S.D. players
Paganese Calcio 1926 players
F.C. Crotone players
Serie B players
Matera Calcio players
Casertana F.C. players
S.S. Chieti Calcio players
Serie C players
Serie D players